Melanotus brunniopacus is a species of beetle in the Elateridae family. The scientific name of this species was first published 1989 by Kishii.

References

Elateridae
Beetles described in 1989